Pasadena Recovery Center is a residential drug and alcohol treatment center located in Pasadena, California. It is licensed by the State of California Drug and Alcohol Programs. It was also the site for Celebrity Rehab with Dr. Drew from 2008 to 2012. The 98-bed facility was opened in 2000 and offers a 12-step based treatment program as well as treatment for dual-diagnosis.

History

Pasadena Recovery Center was founded in 2000 by Dr. Lee Bloom and two of his children; Alison Triessl and Michael Bloom.

It was shut down by the California State health department for failing to report a death on premises in August 2018. Despite the founders statements to the press about their intention to resolve concerns with the state agency after the incident, it has remained closed since 2018.

Prior to opening the facility, Bloom served as a psychiatrist for the U.S. Air Force, offering treatment to U.S. pilots returning home after the Vietnam War. He was also known for his work in chemical dependency for some time before founding Pasadena Recovery Center.

After Bloom's death in 2008, control of Pasadena Recovery Center went to his son, Michael, who opened a sober living center less than a mile from the treatment facility to accommodate patients transitioning from treatment. Bloom’s wife, Tobie Bloom currently serves as chairman of the board for the center.

References

Drug and alcohol rehabilitation centers
Pasadena, California
Addiction organizations in the United States
Mental health organizations in California